Kommyunit Nezin (literally "Communist Daily") was a daily newspaper in Burma, published by the Communist Party of Burma from Rangoon in the latter half of the 1940s.

References

Burmese-language newspapers
Daily newspapers published in Myanmar
Communist newspapers
Mass media in Yangon